Jonathan Silva is the name of

 Jonathan Cristian Silva (born 1994), Argentine footballer
 Jonathan Henrique Silva (born 1991), Brazilian triple jumper
 Jonathan da Silva (born 1990), Brazilian sprinter